Pipo en de P-P-Parelridder (English translation: Pipo and the p-p-Pearl Knight) is a 2003 Dutch movie based on the children's television show Pipo de Clown. The film received a Golden Film for having drawn 100,000 visitors.

Background
From the late 1950s on, Pipo de Clown was one of the earliest and most popular children's television shows in the Netherlands. The show finally ended in 1980. In the late 1990s, the return of Pipo was touched upon when television talk show host Ivo Niehe interviewed Belinda Meuldijk, the daughter of Pipo's creator (Wim Meuldijk), and her husband, singer Rob de Nijs. Niehe tried to sell the idea to various broadcasters but without success, and the rights were bought by Endemol. Auditions were held, and Joep Dorren was chosen as the new Pipo. The script for a pilot and for six episodes was written, and the 40-minute-long pilot (filmed in 1999 on Rob de Nijs's estate) proved very popular, selling 100,000 copies on video; still, the public broadcasting corporations had no faith in Pipo's chance of success and thought it would be too expensive. In the end Endemol decided to make the series into a feature movie, Pipo en de p-p-parelridder, directed by Martin Lagestee and with a script by Wim Meuldijk.

Production and cast
The script is loosely based on a 1960 Pipo TV series, Pipo en de Slaapridder, which was filmed on location for 9000 guilders. The movie was filmed in Spain for around €3.5 million and premiered in November 2003. The role of Snuf, one of the two crooks, was played by Rudi Falkenhagen, age 72. Falkenhagen was the last survivor of the original television show and Snuf was his first big role. He died two years later. Tara Elders, who starred in a number of Theo van Gogh movies, plays the part of the titular character's lady lover.

Plot
Pipo receives a letter from Aunt Anouschka, asking him for help with mysterious events in a nearby castle which appears to be haunted. Pipo leaves the circus in the hands of his wife Mamaloe and daughter Petra, to the chagrin of circus director Dikke Deur —a circus without Pipo sells fewer tickets. When Pipo arrives at the castle there is no ghost; instead, he finds a knight who has been asleep for 500 years. He is awakened, but the next problem is finding and waking his lady lover, who has also been asleep that long.

Investment and payout
The movie cost about €3.5 million to make. It brought in €692,665 in 2003 and €815,120 in 2004.

Sequel
In 2007, rumors circulated that a second Pipo film was to be made, Pipo & Het Geheim Van De Barkini Driehoek, written by Meuldijk and directed by Lagestee, with Joep Dorre returning as Pipo. The Indian Klukkluk, notably absent from Pipo en de p-p-Parelridder, was to make his return. The movie, according to Meuldijk, was to be released at the end of 2008. However, Meuldijk died in 2007, and though a musical, Pipo en de Gestolen Stem, was produced in 2009, no movie has been released.

References

External links

2003 films
2000s Dutch-language films
Dutch children's films
Films based on television series
Films shot in Spain
Comedy films about clowns
Circus films